Ranjit Rai (born 8 April 1969) is an Indian-born Canadian field hockey player. He competed in the men's tournament at the 1988 Summer Olympics.

References

External links
 

1969 births
Living people
Canadian male field hockey players
Olympic field hockey players of Canada
Field hockey players at the 1988 Summer Olympics
Place of birth missing (living people)
Indian emigrants to Canada
Canadian sportspeople of Indian descent
Canadian people of Punjabi descent